Brachmia elaeophanes is a moth in the family Gelechiidae. It was described by Edward Meyrick in 1930. It is found in China.

References

Moths described in 1930
Brachmia
Taxa named by Edward Meyrick
Moths of Asia